IFIT proteins (Interferon Induced proteins with Tetratricopeptide repeats) are produced in the human body and are supposed to confer immunity against viral infection. These proteins are generally produced during viral infection; Interferon (IFN) treatment;  and during pathogen recognition (Pathogen associated molecular pattern recognition) by the immune system during infections. 

So far, four families of this protein have been identified in humans which are IFIT1, IFIT2, IFIT3 and IFIT5 and other variants have been found in different species. Birds, marsupials, frogs and fish have been found to produce only IFIT5 type proteins. These proteins differ from each other in having different numbers of tetratricopeptide repeats (TPRs). The IFIT1 is known to possess 6 TPRs and IFIT2 has 4 TPRs.  The IFIT proteins that are produced in humans and mice are 40%-45% similar. It is thought that the gene encoding IFIT proteins in different species has a common ancestry.

Origins of IFIT Proteins 

IFIT protein encoding genes (IFIT genes) are known to have originated in vertebrates about 450 million years ago. These genes are mostly conserved throughout evolution suggesting that they have a common protective role in all species.

Anti viral mechanism of IFIT proteins 

IFIT proteins are suggested to show anti viral activity in two ways; one, by binding specifically to viral nucleic acids and the other, by directly binding to eukaryotic initiation factor 3 (eIF3) and preventing eIF3 from initiating the translational process. Experimental data and the three dimensional structure of IFIT1 reveals that the proteins bind to viral PPP RNA in a sequence specific manner. Few viruses like Rift Valley fever virus (RVFV), vesicular stomatitis virus (VSV), and influenza A produce PPP RNA nucleic acid during their life cycle.

References

Human proteins